Anubias gracilis is a plant that was first mentioned in 1920 by Chevalier and thereafter validly described by Hutchinson and Dalziel in 1936.

Distribution
West Africa: Sierra Leone and Guinea.

Description

Cultivation
This plant grows best when only partially submersed and when not crowded by other plants. It requires a lot of nutrients, a loose, iron-rich substrate, and moderate-to-strong light. It prefers a temperature range of 22-26 degrees C (72-79 degrees F). It can be propagated by dividing the rhizome.

References

gracilis
Aquatic plants
Flora of West Tropical Africa
Plants described in 1936